I&C may refer to:

 Information and Computation (Journal)
 Information and communication technology
 Industrial and commercial
 Instrumentation and control
 Information and Control (Journal)
 Installation and commissioning
 Installation and checkout
 Implementation and compliance
 Issues and criteria
 Instrumentation and communications